The 1983 Icelandic Cup was the 24th edition of the National Football Cup.

It took place between 23 May 1983 and 28 August 1983, with the final played at Laugardalsvöllur in Reykjavik. The cup was important, as winners qualified for the UEFA Cup Winners' Cup (if a club won both the league and the cup, the defeated finalists would take their place in the Cup Winners' Cup).

The 10 clubs from the 1. Deild entered in the last 16, with clubs from lower tiers entering in the three preliminary rounds. Teams played one-legged matches. In case of a draw, the match was replayed at the opposition's ground.

ÍA Akranes retained their title by beating ÍBV Vestmannaeyjar in the final. They won the first double since Valur Reykjavik in 1976 and meant that the losing finalists qualified for Europe.

First round

Second round

Third round

Fourth round 

 Entry of ten teams from the 1. Deild

Quarter finals

Semi finals

Final 

 ÍA Akranes won their third Icelandic Cup. As they also won the league, ÍBV Vestmannaeyjar qualified for the 1984–85 European Cup Winners' Cup.

See also 

 1983 Úrvalsdeild
 Icelandic Men's Football Cup

External links 
  1983 Icelandic Cup results at the site of the Icelandic Football Federation

Icelandic Men's Football Cup
Iceland
1983 in Iceland